WRON-FM is a country formatted broadcast radio station licensed to Lewisburg, West Virginia, serving the Lewisburg/Ronceverte/Rainelle/Union area.  WRON-FM is owned and operated by Radio Greenbrier, Inc.

Station Swap and Sale

All Access reported on September 20, 2007 that Todd P. Robinson, Inc.'s WKCJ (now WVBB) would be swapped to Radio Greenbrier, Inc. for WRON-FM.  This took place on August 1, 2008.  WKCJ (now at 97.7) applied to move south to Elliston-Lafayette, Virginia (which is between Roanoke and Christiansburg).

The swap ensured that when Todd P. Robinson, Inc. moves the 97.7 frequency, WRON-FM will continue to have an FM station serving Greenbrier County, West Virginia.

On Wednesday, July 13, 2011, Roanoke, Virginia based Mel Wheeler, Inc. agreed to purchase the station for $675,000.  A new application was filed to move the signal to Elliston-Lafayette, on Fort Lewis Mountain, broadcasting 260 watts, but from a height of 1542 feet.

On December 2, 2011, Mel Wheeler, Inc. took ownership and control of WKCJ and began simulcasting Lynchburg based WVBE-FM.  On December 9, 2011, the callsign was changed to WVBB.

External links
 103.1 The Bear official website
 
 
 

RON-FM
Oldies radio stations in the United States